Edison Antonio Ciavattone Sampérez (born 20 September 1938) is an Uruguayan basketball player, born in Montevideo, who competed in the 1960 Summer Olympics and in the 1964 Summer Olympics.

References

External links
 

1938 births
Living people
Sportspeople from Montevideo
Uruguayan men's basketball players
1963 FIBA World Championship players
1967 FIBA World Championship players
Olympic basketball players of Uruguay
Basketball players at the 1960 Summer Olympics
Basketball players at the 1963 Pan American Games
Basketball players at the 1964 Summer Olympics
Pan American Games competitors for Uruguay